Big Trouble in Little China is a side-scrolling beat 'em up designed by Mev Dinc and published by Electric Dreams Software in 1986 for the Amstrad CPC, Commodore 64, and ZX Spectrum. It is a tie-in licence for the film of the same name.

Gameplay
The player controls one of the three main protagonists and may switch between them during play. The characters progresses from right to left – an unusual orientation in this genre of game – fighting oncoming enemies. Initially, the three characters fight unarmed, but each has a weapon of choice that can be collected. Jack Burton can use a gun with limited ammunition, and Wang Chi can wield swords which eventually break. The third character, Egg Shen, initially fires weak magic bolts which improve with range and strength when he finds a magic potion.

Reception
Big Trouble in Little China received diverse critical reception. Your Sinclair awarded 8 out of 10, highlighting smooth scrolling and good sprite animation, only criticising the unbalanced difficulty with some enemies. In a later retrospective on tie-in licences, Your Sinclair found the animation to be poor, with little variety in enemy types, and amended their score to 52%. Conversely, Sinclair User gave only 1 star out of 5, describing the characters as poorly depicted, with no atmosphere or sound effects.

References

1986 video games
Amstrad CPC games
Beat 'em ups
Commodore 64 games
Video games based on films
Video games developed in the United Kingdom
Video games set in San Francisco
ZX Spectrum games